Playbrush is an oral care invention for children that is designed to encourage kids to brush their teeth regularly and properly via gamification.

There are three Playbrush devices (The Smart, the Smart sonic and the Smart One X)--all of which are developed by an Austro-British company with the same name. One is a dongle that fits onto the end of a manual toothbrush, whereas the newer device is a Sonic-integrated toothbrush. Both innovations connect via Bluetooth Low Energy to a smartphone or tablet. The movement of the brush is recorded by motion sensors in the dongle which then transmit the data to a mobile device. This is done to control a variety of different games with the intent to encourage children to spend a full two minutes brushing their teeth. The Sonic-integrated toothbrush also provides feedback on pressure.

History

The technology was developed in 2014 and 2015 by Austrian entrepreneur Paul Varga. Varga observed the behaviour of his three-year-old godson during bedtime rituals while the child was entertained by video clips on their tablet. Together with childhood friend Matthäus Ittner, former fellow student Tolulope Ogunsina, and with help from the University College London, Varga began development of Playbrush in summer 2014. rush launched in November of the same year with mobile apps for Android and iOS in Austria, Germany, and the United Kingdom. In 2018 the electric toothbrush Playbrush Smart Sonic was released.

Technology

Playbrush's technology consists of hardware and software.

The hardware is an Internet of Things technology integrated in either a dongle for manual toothbrushes or into an electric toothbrush. The electronics include motion sensors to detect where users are brushing and to provide feedback on brushing behaviour. The motion is captured and transmitted in real-time to the users' smartphone or tablet. Playbrush's app then translates the brushing data into various interactive games that children control via their brushing movements. In summer 2018, Playbrush had eleven games available in addition to a brushing coach, which are downloadable via Google Play and the Apple App Store. There is also a detailed statistics section which provides historical feedback for parents and dentists.

Awards

The technology and company has received various awards:
 UCL Bright Ideas Award 2014
 TNW Europe Top 3 Startup - 2015
 Best Technological Innovative Contribution Award (Gamification World Awards 2015)
 Health Media Award 2016
 Pitch@Palace Finalist 2016
 Forbes Austria Start-up Academy 2016
 Bits & Pretzels Pro 7 Special Award (250.000 TV Budget Price) 2017

References

Dental equipment